During the 2003–04 season, Hertha BSC competed in the Bundesliga.

Season summary
After five seasons of finishing in the European places, Hertha slumped to 12th, seven points clear of relegation. Manager Huub Stevens had paid for the poor form with his job in December, and his replacement Hans Meyer failed to continue Hertha's streak of European qualification. Meyer left at the end of the season, with Falko Götz - a former Hertha BSC II manager and Hertha caretaker manager - appointed as his replacement.

Players

First-team squad
Squad at end of season

Left club during season

Hertha BSC II

Transfers

Out

References

Notes

Hertha BSC seasons
Hertha BSC